The year 697 BC was a year of the pre-Julian Roman calendar. In the Roman Empire, it was known as year 57 Ab urbe condita . The denomination 697 BC for this year has been used since the early medieval period, when the Anno Domini calendar era became the prevalent method in Europe for naming years.

Events

By place

Kingdom of Judah 
 Manasseh becomes co-ruler with King Hezekiah of Judah.

Births 
 Duke Wen of Jin, ruler of the state of Jin

Deaths 
 Zhou huan wang, King of the Zhou Dynasty of China.

References